The Last Crooked Mile is a 1946 American crime film directed by Philip Ford and written by Jerry Sackheim and Jerome Gruskin. The film stars Don "Red" Barry, Ann Savage, Adele Mara, Tom Powers, Sheldon Leonard and Nestor Paiva. The film was released on August 9, 1946, by Republic Pictures.

Plot
After a bank robbery, the loot disappears and is sought after by an insurance investigator, the police and the surviving robbers.

Cast   
Don "Red" Barry as Tom Dwyer
Ann Savage as Sheila Kennedy
Adele Mara as Bonnie
Tom Powers as Floyd Sorelson
Sheldon Leonard as Ed 'Wires' MacGuire
Nestor Paiva as Ferrara
Harry Shannon as Police Lt. Blake
Ben Welden as Haynes
John Miljan as Police Lt. Mayrin
Charles D. Brown as Dietrich
John Dehner as Jarvis 
Anthony Caruso as Charlie 
The Seven Pods of Pepper as Singing Group

References

External links 
 

1946 films
American crime films
1946 crime films
Republic Pictures films
Films directed by Philip Ford
American black-and-white films
1940s English-language films
1940s American films